Tsater is a village in the Lori Province of Armenia. There is a small S. Astvatsatsin church on the southern edge of the village with a bell tower which was used as an electrical substation in Soviet times. About 3/4 kilometer north of the village, abutting the cliff is a small Chgnavor chapel of the 11-12th century.

References 

Populated places in Lori Province